Peg O'Connor, is a Professor of Philosophy and Gender, Women, and Sexuality Studies as well as Chair of the Department of Philosophy at Gustavus Adolphus College. Her present research interests include two separate but intersecting strains: Wittgenstein's approach to ethics, and the philosophy of addiction.  She also contributes to public discourse about her areas of interest through contributing to popular media, especially around philosophical issues surrounding addiction, and has actively spoken out about issues of gender equity facing the field of philosophy.

Education and career
O'Connor earned her bachelor's degree from Wesleyan University in 1987, and her master's and doctorate in philosophy from the University of Minnesota in 1993 and 1996, respectively. Her doctoral thesis focused on Wittgensteinian moral realism. While pursuing her doctorate, O'Connor also acted as an instructor of philosophy at the University of Minnesota from 1994 to 1995, and an instructor of philosophy at Moorhead State University from 1995 to 1996.  After completing her doctorate, O'Connor accepted a position as Visiting Assistant Professor of Philosophy at Gustavus Adolphus College from 1996 to 1999, before accepting a position as Assistant Professor of Women's Studies at Gustavus Adolphus. She was raised to Associate Professor in 2003, and to full Professor in 2007 in both Philosophy and Women's, Gender, and Sexuality Studies. O'Connor has also acted in several administrative capacities, including becoming Chairperson of the Department of Philosophy at Gustavus Adolphus in 2011, and serving as director of Gustavus Adolphus's Women's Studies Program from 1999 to 2004 and again from 2004 to 2011.

Research areas
O'Connor's present research interests include two separate but intersecting strains: Wittgenstein's approach to ethics, and the philosophy of addiction. She has also written extensively about issues involving gender equity and harassment, sexuality, abuse, and oppression.

Publications
O'Connor has published two books, and is working on a third. She has also edited a pair of books, contributed a number of book and encyclopedia chapters, and published a number of journal articles.

O'Connor's first book, published in 2002, was titled Oppression and Responsibility: A Wittgensteinian Approach to Social Practices and Moral Theory, and drew on a primarily Wittgensteinian framework to articulate various forms of political oppression (focusing on forms she views as primarily invisible because their existence relies on rarely questioned assumptions,) and to put forward a theory of moral responsibility. Her second book, published in 2008, was titled  Morality and Our Complicated Form of Life: Feminist Wittgensteinian Metaethics and opposed both realist and antirealist positions to metaethics, suggesting instead a Wittgensteinian approach that she refers to as "felted contextualism."

O'Connor's third book will explore issues of addiction and recovery through the lens of philosophy. In an interview on her book, she states: "Addicts are frequently very philosophical; we tend to be armchair thinkers. Addicts struggle with issues of self-identity, self-knowledge and self-deception, the nature of God, existential dilemmas, marking the line between appearance and reality, free will and voluntariness, and moral responsibility. These are prompted by acute instances of self-examination and reflection about how to live well."

O'Connor also maintains a blog on Psychology Today that deals with the philosophy of addiction, contributes to the New York Times' Opinionator and The Stone blogs about similar topics, and co-maintains the Stanford Encyclopedia of Philosophy's article about topics in feminism.

Selected bibliography

Books 
 
 
 
 
 O'Connor, Peg (2016). Life on the rocks: finding meaning in addiction and recovery. Las Vegas, NV: Central Recovery Press.

References

External links 

 Profile page: Peg O'Connor Gustavus Adolphus College, St. Peter's, Minnesota

1965 births
21st-century American philosophers
American women philosophers
Feminist philosophers
Gustavus Adolphus College faculty
Living people
University of Minnesota College of Liberal Arts alumni
Wesleyan University alumni
Wittgensteinian philosophers
21st-century American women